AS Fortior is a Malagasy football club based in Toamasina, Madagascar.

Achievements
THB Champions League: 4
1962, 1963, 1999, 2000

Coupe de Madagascar: 1
2002

Performance in CAF competitions
CAF Champions League: 2 appearances
2000 – Preliminary Round
2001 – Preliminary Round

CAF Cup Winners' Cup: 1 appearance
2003 – Preliminary Round

References

Football clubs in Madagascar
Toamasina